The 2022 Campeonato Baiano (officially the Campeonato Baiano de Futebol Profissional Série “A” – Edição 2022) was the 118th edition of Bahia's top professional football league organized by FBF. The competition began on 15 January and ended on 10 April 2022.

This was the first season in history without a team from Salvador ranked in the top four of the tournament.

The defending champions Atlético de Alagoinhas defeated Jacuipense 3–1 on aggregate obtaining their second title. As champions, Atlético de Alagoinhas qualified for the 2023 Copa do Brasil and the 2023 Copa do Nordeste.

Format
In the first stage, each team played the other nine teams in a single round-robin tournament. Top four teams advanced to the semi-finals. The bottom two teams were relegated to the 2023 Campeonato Baiano Série B.

The final stage was played on a home-and-away two-legged basis with the best overall performance team hosting the second leg. If tied on aggregate, the penalty shoot-out would be used to determine the winners.

Champions qualified for the 2023 Copa do Brasil and 2023 Copa do Nordeste, while runners-up and third place qualified for the 2023 Copa do Brasil. Top two teams not already qualified for 2023 Série A, Série B or Série C qualified for 2023 Campeonato Brasileiro Série D. As the 2022 Copa Governador was not held, the third Série D berth was awarded via Campeonato Baiano.

Teams

First stage

Group 1

Final stage

Bracket

Semi-finals

|}

Group 2

Jacuipense qualified for the finals.

Group 3

Atlético de Alagoinhas qualified for the finals.

Finals

|}

Group 4

Overall table

Top goalscorers

References 

Campeonato Baiano
Baiano
2022 in Brazilian football